The Complete Druid's Handbook is an accessory for the 2nd edition of the Advanced Dungeons & Dragons fantasy role-playing game.

Contents
The Complete Druid's Handbook presents new kits (including Beastfriend, Hivemaster, Shapeshifter) and spells along with a discussion of sacred groves (druids prefer ponds to streams, because still water is less distracting).

Publication history
The Complete Druid's Handbook was written by David Pulver, and published by TSR, Inc.

Reception
Rick Swan reviewed The Complete Druid's Handbook for Dragon magazine #214 (February 1995). He comments that, of "particular interest to novice players, Pulver uses clear examples to explain the art of playing neutral characters; for instance, a druid won't kill a dragon just because it's evil, but he might if it threatens his forest". Swan concluded by calling the book: "A satisfying entry in one of TSR's most ambitious projects."

Reviews
Backstab #6

References

Dungeons & Dragons sourcebooks
Role-playing game supplements introduced in 1994